Lu Jun may refer to:

Lu Jun (referee) (born 1959), Chinese football referee
Lu Jun (engineer) (born 1964), Chinese electronic engineer
Lü Jun (born 1967), Chinese executive, chairman of COFCO Group